Hanna Lazarevych (?-1737), was the Hetmana of the Cossack Hetmanate by marriage to Pavlo Polubotok, Hetman of Ukraine (r. 1722-1724).

References

Year of birth unknown
Date of death unknown
1737 deaths

18th-century Ukrainian people
People from the Cossack Hetmanate